This is a list of all the ultra prominent peaks (with topographic prominence greater than 1,500 metres) in Northeast Asia. There are 53 in total.

Baikal to Okhotsk

Eastern Siberia

Kamchatka

Kuril Islands

Korea and Manchuria

Sources
List - Kamchatka & Kurils
List - Siberia
Map

North East Asia Ultras
Geography of Northeast Asia